St. Anthony's Senior Secondary School is a minority educational institution in Barabanki, Uttar Pradesh, India, founded in 1979 and run by the Catholic Diocese of Lucknow.

The school is affiliated with the Central Board of Secondary Education, New Delhi.

See also
 Anand Bhawan School

References

Catholic secondary schools in India
Primary schools in Uttar Pradesh
High schools and secondary schools in Uttar Pradesh
Christian schools in Uttar Pradesh
Schools in Barabanki, Uttar Pradesh
Educational institutions established in 1979
1979 establishments in Uttar Pradesh